Əliquluuşağı is a village in the Qubadli District of Azerbaijan. Əli Nuri (Əliağa Nuriyev)Əli Nuri

Gallery

References 

Travelpost Entry 

Populated places in Qubadli District